Sablon (in French) is a fine sand used as an abrasive and may refer to the following:

Surname 
 Edmond Tarbé des Sablons, (1838-1900), French journalist and man of letters
 Germaine Sablon (1899–1985), French singer and film actress, sister of Jean Sablon
 Jean Sablon (1906–1994), popular French singer and actor

Toponyms
 Sablon (Brussels), an area in the historic center of Brussels, Belgium
 Sablon, a neighborhood of Metz
 Les Sablons (Paris Métro), a station of the Paris Metro located in Neuilly-sur-Seine, France
 Blanc-Sablon, Quebec, municipality on North-Shore in Quebec, Canada